William G. Distin (1884–1970), an architect of Saranac Lake, New York, was an early associate of Great Camp designer William L. Coulter who went on to design a number of Adirondack Great Camps.

Born in Plattsburgh, his family moved to Saranac Lake in 1889.  After graduation from Saranac Lake High School in 1900, he was hired by William Coulter as a draftsman; his apprenticeship lasted six or seven years.  After Coulter's death in 1907, Distin attended Columbia University, graduating in 1910.  After a short period in Chicago, working for S. S. Beekman designing houses, he traveled for a time in Europe.  Returning to Saranac Lake about 1912, he joined the successor to Coulter's architectural firm, run by Max H. Westhoff, Coulter's former partner.  In 1917, Distin worked for the Army building hospitals in Washington, D.C.  After the war, he returned to Saranac Lake to reopen Westhoff's firm, the latter having moved to Springfield, Massachusetts.  In 1920, he designed Distin Cottage for his father, photographer William L. Distin.

He and his firm, Distin  Wilson, designed the ice arena in Lake Placid for the 1932 Winter Olympics.

After some smaller commissions for camps on Upper Saranac Lake such as Camp Intermission, he designed Camp Wonundra for William Rockefeller in 1934.  In 1937 he built "Eagle Nest" at Blue Mountain Lake for Walter Hochschild, in 1940 Debar Pond Lodge, and in 1948, Camp Minnowbrook, in the same area, for R.M. Hollingshead.  There were also seven smaller great camps on Lake Placid, and work on the Lake Placid Club.

Distin also designed a number of notable churches, including St. John’s in the Wilderness Episcopal Church in Paul Smiths, Saint Barnards Catholic Church in Saranac Lake, Saint Eustace Episcopal Church in Lake Placid, and the Island Chapel, on Upper Saranac Lake.  He also designed the replacement of the original Adirondak Loj, which burned in a catastrophic fire that swept Essex County in 1903.

References

Further reading 
 Gilborn, Craig.  Adirondack Camps:  Homes Away from Home, 1850-1950.  Blue Mountain Lake, NY:  Adirondack Museum;  Syracuse:  Syracuse University Press, 2000.

1884 births
1970 deaths
Franklin County, New York
Essex County, New York
Adirondack Great Camps
Architects from New York (state)
People from Plattsburgh, New York
People from Saranac Lake, New York